The Ephraim Palace is a Rococo-style building in Berlin, Germany, originally constructed in 1766. Despite the destruction of the palace in 1936 by Nazi Germany, the beginning of a reconstruction was possible in 1985, as many elements of the facade had been stored in East Germany. Today, the Ephraim Palace is a cultural-heritage property and houses a museum, mostly dealing with cultural topics.

The Ephraim Palace is named after Veitel Heine Ephraim, who hired the experienced architect Friedrich Wilhelm Dieterichs to design a palace on the property of the oldest pharmacy of Berlin.

Bibliography 
 Rolf-Herbert Krüger. "Das Ephraim-Palais in Berlin – Ein Beitrag zur preußischen Kulturgeschichte". Berlin: Verlag für Bauwesen, 1990.

External links
 "Museum Ephraim-Palais", history and data about the Ephraim Palace at the website of the museum of Ephraim Palace (in German)
 "Palais Ephraim", history, data and literature about Ephraim Palace at the official website of the city of Berlin (in German)

Houses completed in 1766
Houses completed in 1987
Buildings and structures in Mitte
Palaces in Berlin
Prussian cultural sites
Rebuilt buildings and structures in Berlin
Rococo architecture
Rococo architecture in Germany